Todua is a Georgian surname. Notable people with the surname include:

Alexander Todua (born 1987), Georgian rugby union player
David Todua (footballer, born 1998), Russian footballer
David Todua (footballer, born 2000), Russian footballer
Elvira Todua (born 1986), Abkhazian football goalkeeper
Mzia Todua (born 1956), Georgian lawyer and judge
Natia Todua (born 1996), Georgian-German singer
Sevasti Todua (born 1976), Georgian football player
Nugzar Todua (born 1964), Georgian Professor

Surnames of Georgian origin
Georgian-language surnames
Surnames of Abkhazian origin